Philipp Schmid (born 7 May 1986) is a German alpine ski racer.

He competed at the 2015 World Championships in Beaver Creek, US, in the slalom.

References

1986 births
German male alpine skiers
Living people
21st-century German people